TC Huo is a Laotian American author, of Chinese descent, who emigrated from Laos to the United States in 1980 and now lives in Oakland, California. He has written the novels A Thousand Wings and Land of Smiles. In 2001, he received the award for adult fiction from the Asian/Pacific American Librarians Association.

References

Living people
Year of birth missing (living people)
Laotian emigrants to the United States
American novelists of Chinese descent
American writers of Laotian descent
American male novelists